Gabala City Stadium is a multi-use stadium in Gabala, Azerbaijan.  It is currently used mostly for football matches and is the home stadium of Gabala FK. The stadium has an all-seated capacity of 2,000 spectators.

It is planned to start the reconstruction of the stadium in 2012 and expand the capacity of the stadium up to 15,000 seats.

References

See also
List of football stadiums in Azerbaijan

Football venues in Azerbaijan
Sports venues completed in 1985
Qabala District
1985 establishments in the Soviet Union